Jimmy Leawood Martin (born August 24, 1934) is an American former politician in the state of South Carolina. He served in the South Carolina Senate as a member of the Democratic Party from 1972 to 1976 and in the South Carolina House of Representatives from 1969 to 1970, representing Richland County, South Carolina. He is a realtor in West Columbia, South Carolina.

References

1934 births
Living people
Democratic Party members of the South Carolina House of Representatives
Democratic Party South Carolina state senators
People from Aynor, South Carolina
People from Richland County, South Carolina
People from West Columbia, South Carolina